The United States competed at the 1980 World Championships in Athletics in Sittard, Netherlands, from August 14 to 16,  1980. The championships consisted of two events the women's 400 meters and 3000 meters. The USA entered six and none won a medal.

Results

400 meters

3000 meters

References

Nations at the 1980 World Championships in Athletics
World Championships in Athletics
1980